George Rammell Taylor (born 25 November 1909 — 21 October 1986) was an English first-class cricketer who played for Hampshire.

Taylor was born at Havant in November 1909. He was educated at Lancing College, where he played for the college cricket team. Taylor was a right-handed batsman who usually batted in the lower order in first-class cricket and a slow right-arm occasional bowler. He made a single appearance for Hampshire during the 1935 County Championship, scoring 0 and 21 in a home match against Lancashire. In the 1939 season with no other amateur available for more than a few matches, Taylor captained Hampshire, though he did not appear in the final few matches of the season when Giles Baring was available to play and was worth a place in the team on merit. The move to appoint Taylor as captain was not a success, and the team won only two out of 23 matches under his captaincy. In his obituary in the 1987 edition of Wisden Cricketers' Almanack, it was noted that he "would never have claimed to be more than a club player". He ended his career with 306 runs from 37 innings at an average of 9.27 and with a highest score of just 41, made in the match against Lancashire.

A solicitor, Taylor died in Romsey, Hampshire in 1986 at the age of 76.

References

External links
George Taylor at Cricinfo
George Taylor at CricketArchive

1909 births
1986 deaths
English cricketers
Hampshire cricketers
Hampshire cricket captains
People from Havant